Granville Township, Pennsylvania is the name of two places in the U.S.:
Granville Township, Bradford County, Pennsylvania
Granville Township, Mifflin County, Pennsylvania

Pennsylvania township disambiguation pages